The Mushyl lake (Müšyl Jer), nicknamed the Sea Eye (Morskoy Glaz) is a minor karst lake in Shariboksad, Volzhsky District, Mari El, Russia. Located at the foot of the hill its bright green water is extremely deep (38.5 m) compared to the surface area (45x50 m).

Etymology
Müšyl ([]) means crater in the Mari language. In early documents it was known only by its Mari name, written in the Russian text with Mari diacritics. Later, Russian-speaking tourists were inspired by the sea-like colour of the water to give it the more poetic Russian name.

Popular culture
According to Mari legend, a wedding procession fell into the Sea Eye and died when it suddenly appeared in an eruption.

The lake has become popular with tourists.

References

Lakes of Mari El
Sinkholes of Europe